The 2016–17 season was Eibar's third consecutive season in La Liga after finishing in 14th place the previous season to ensure another year in the Spanish top flight.

Season
On 5 May, Eibar announced their first ever international tour with visits to Philadelphia, Pennsylvania and Las Vegas, Nevada in the United States. The tour objectives as stated by the club were, "to improve the brand image, the internationalization of the club, bring the club to shareholders, fans and club members in this country and open up possibilities for sponsorship mediums in the United States." On 23 May,  Eibar announced the election of Amaia Gorostiza as the new president and the first female to hold the post for the club. Later in the day, the first match of the US Tour was held at Richard Wackar Stadium at Rowan University in Glassboro, New Jersey, against the Philadelphia Fury of the American Soccer League (ASL). The match ended 1–1 with a goal from Borja Bastón in the 44th minute. The team played their next match at Sam Boyd Stadium in Las Vegas versus the New York Cosmos of the North American Soccer League (NASL). The match ended 2–2 with goals from Gonzalo Escalante and Antonio Luna, respectively; however, the team went on to lose 5–4 in the penalty shoot-out.

On 20 July, Eibar announced a partnership agreement with current Segunda División B club UD Logroñés. The agreement will see Eibar send a minimum of three and a maximum of six players out on loan to Logroñés for the next three seasons. On 19 August, Eibar opened the league season against Deportivo La Coruña at the Estadio Riazor. After scoring first with a goal from Iván Ramis, the game ended 2–1 in favor of the hosts. On 27 August, Eibar earned its first league victory in the home opener, beating Valencia 1–0 with a goal from Pedro León. On 11 September, after the FIFA international break, Eibar defeated Granada at Los Cármenes 2–1 with goals from Pedro León and Sergi Enrich. On 17 September, Eibar claimed a 1–1 draw against Sevilla with nine men after goalkeeper Yoel Rodríguez and captain Dani García both saw red cards. On 20 September, down in La Rosaleda, Eibar lost 2–1 against Málaga with the lone goal coming from La Liga debutante Nano. On 24 September, Eibar defeated Real Sociedad with a scoreline of 2–0, making it the third consecutive victory in Ipurua over their Basque neighbors in the Primera División.

On 2 October, Eibar earned a historic point and a first goal at the Santiago Bernabéu Stadium when they earned a 1–1 draw against European Champions Real Madrid. Fran Rico opened the scoring in the sixth minute with a header in the box for the historic goal. On 17 October, Eibar loss their first home match 2–3 against Osasuna, with goals from Gonzalo Escalante and Sergi Enrich. On 30 October, Eibar fought back to earn all 3 points against Villarreal. After falling a goal back, the Armeros left it late and won 2–1 with goals by Ramis (80th) and Pedro León (87th). On 6 November, Eibar lost on the road in added time on a penalty to Las Palmas with a 0–1 scoreline. On 19 November, Eibar returned home to a 1–0 victory over Celta Vigo. Fran Rico scored Eibar's 100th goal in La Liga play. On 25 November, Eibar thumped Real Betis 3–1 to continue their hot home streak. On 29 November, in the 2016–17 Copa del Rey Round of 32 first leg encounter, Eibar took a 2–1 advantage back home over Sporting Gijon with goals from Bebé and Rubén Peña.

Squad

Team statistics
{|cellpadding="4" cellspacing="0" border="1" style="text-align: center; font-size: 85%; border: gray solid 1px; border-collapse: collapse; "
|- style="background:#8B0000; color:white;"
! rowspan="2"| Number
! rowspan="2"| Position
! rowspan="2"| Name
! rowspan="2"| Age
! rowspan="2"| Since
! colspan="5"| La Liga
! colspan="5"| Copa del Rey
! rowspan="2"| Signed from
! rowspan="2"| Notes
|- style="background:#8B0000; color:white;"
! Apps
! Mins
! 
! 
! 
! Apps
! Mins
! 
! 
! 
|-
! colspan="17" style="background:#dcdcdc; text-align:center;"| Goalkeepers
|-
|1 || GK || align="left"| Yoel Rodríguez ||  || 2016

|20
|1698
|0
|1
|1

|5
|450
|0
|0
|0
|align="left"|Valencia (on loan) ||
|- bgcolor="#EFEFEF"
|13 || GK || align="left"| Asier Riesgo ||  || 2015

|14
|1135
|0
|0
|1

|1
|90
|0
|0
|0
|align="left"|Osasuna ||
|-
|30 || GK || align="left"| Markel Areitio ||  || 2016

|1
|45
|0
|0
|0

|0
|0
|0
|0
|0
|align="left"|Durango ||
|-
! colspan="17" style="background:#dcdcdc; text-align:center;"| Defenders
|-
|3 || CB || align="left"| Álex Gálvez ||  || 2016

|14
|1014
|0
|3
|0

|0
|0
|0
|0
|0
|align="left"| Werder Bremen ||
|- bgcolor="#EFEFEF"
|4 || CB || align="left"| Iván Ramis ||  || 2015

|19
|1482
|3
|4
|0

|0
|0
|0
|0
|0
|align="left"|Levante || 
|-
|7 || RB || align="left"| Ander Capa (vice-captain) ||  || 2012

|26
|2118
|0
|8
|0

|1
|90
|0
|0
|0
|align="left"|Youth system ||
|- bgcolor="#EFEFEF"
|15 || CB || align="left"| Mauro dos Santos ||  || 2015

|11
|763
|0
|1
|0

|1
|90
|0
|0
|0
|align="left"|Almería ||
|-
|18 || RB || align="left"| Anaitz Arbilla ||  || 2016

|18
|1345
|0
|4
|0

|0
|0
|0
|0
|0
|align="left"|Espanyol || 
|- bgcolor="#EFEFEF"
|19 || LB || align="left"| Antonio Luna ||  || 2015

|25
|2076
|1
|3
|0

|0
|0
|0
|0
|0
|align="left"| Aston Villa ||
|-
|20 || CB || align="left"| Florian Lejeune ||  || 2016

|29
|2520
|1
|6
|1

|1
|90
|0
|0
|0
|align="left"| Manchester City ||
|- bgcolor="#EFEFEF"
|23 || LB || align="left"| David Juncà ||  || 2015

|3
|186
|0
|1
|0

|1
|90
|0
|0
|0
|align="left"|Girona ||
|-
! colspan="17" style="background:#dcdcdc; text-align:center;"| Midfielders
|-
|5 || MF || align="left"| Gonzalo Escalante ||  || 2015

|26
|1723
|2
|8
|0

|1
|90
|0
|1
|0
|align="left"| Catania ||
|- bgcolor="#EFEFEF"
|6 || MF || align="left"| Cristian Rivera ||  || 2016

|12
|510
|0
|1
|0

|1
|75
|0
|1
|0
|align="left"|Real Oviedo ||
|-
|8 || |AM || align="left"| Takashi Inui || | || 2015

|22
|1590
|1
|5
|0

|1
|5
|0
|0
|0
|align="left"| Eintracht Frankfurt ||
|- bgcolor="#EFEFEF"
|10 || AM || align="left"| Jota ||  || 2016

|5
|200
|0
|0
|0

|1
|90
|0
|0
|0
|align="left"| Brentford (on loan) ||
|-
|11 || MF || align="left"| Rubén Peña ||  || 2016

|25
|967
|1
|2
|0

|1
|90
|1
|0
|0
|align="left"|Leganés ||
|- bgcolor="#EFEFEF"
|14 || MF || align="left"| Dani García (captain) ||  || 2014

|30
|2645
|1
|8
|1

|0
|0
|0
|0
|0
|align="left"|Real Sociedad ||
|-
|16 || MF || align="left"| Fran Rico ||  || 2016

|17
|1226
|2
|5
|0

|1
|15
|0
|0
|0
|align="left"|Granada (on loan) ||
|- bgcolor="#EFEFEF"
|21 || MF || align="left"| Pedro León ||  || 2016

|32
|2620
|10
|4
|0

|0
|0
|0
|0
|0
|align="left"|Getafe ||
|-
|24 || MF || align="left"| Adrián González ||  || 2015

|23
|1379
|7
|3
|0

|0
|0
|0
|0
|0
|align="left"|Elche ||
|-
! colspan="17" style="background:#dcdcdc; text-align:center;"| Forwards
|-
|9 || FW || align="left"| Sergi Enrich ||  || 2015

|32
|2364
|10
|4
|0

|0
|0
|0
|0
|0
|align="left"|Numancia ||
|- bgcolor="#EFEFEF"
|17 || FW || align="left"| Kike ||  || 2016

|18
|1083
|6
|7
|0

|1
|19
|0
|0
|0
|align="left"| Middlesbrough ||
|-
|22 || FW || align="left"| Nano ||  || 2016

|6
|159
|1
|0
|0

|1
|85
|0
|0
|0
| align="left"|Tenerife || 
|- bgcolor="#EFEFEF"
|25 || FW || align="left"| Bebé ||  || 2016

|19
|678
|3
|2
|0

|1
|71
|1
|0
|0
|align="left"| Benfica ||
|-

From youth squad

Technical staff
{|cellpadding="4" cellspacing="0" border="1" style="text-align: center; font-size: 85%; border: gray solid 1px; border-collapse: collapse;"
|-
! style="background:#8B0000; color:white; text-align:center;"| Position
! style="background:#8B0000; color:white; text-align:center;"| Name
|-
|align="left"|First team manager || align="left"|José Luis Mendilibar
|- bgcolor="#EFEFEF"
|align="left"|Assistant coach || align="left"|Iñaki Bea
|-
|style="text-align: left;" rowspan="2"|Fitness coach || align="left"|Toni Ruiz
|-
|align="left"|Alain Gandiaga
|- bgcolor="#EFEFEF"
|align="left"|Goalkeeping coach || align="left"|Josu Anuzita
|-
|style="text-align: left;" rowspan="2"|Physiotherapist || align="left"|Manu Sánchez
|-
|align="left"|Unai Ormazabal
|- bgcolor="#EFEFEF"
|align="left"|Doctor || align="left"|Alberto Fernández
|-
|align="left"|Team liaison || align="left"|German Andueza
|- bgcolor="#EFEFEF"
|align="left"|Equipment manager || align="left"|Ángel Fernández

Transfers

In

Out

Competitions

Overall

Record

Pre-season and friendlies
Kickoff times are in CEST or CET.

Primera División

League table

Results summary

Result round by round

Matches
Kickoff times are in CEST or CET.

Copa del Rey

Kickoff times are in CET or CEST.

References

External links

SD Eibar
SD Eibar seasons